Thomas Francis Meehan (31 March 1926  19 October 2018) was an Australian rules footballer who played with St Kilda and Fitzroy in the Victorian Football League (VFL). He later played with Brighton in the Victorian Football Association.

He served in the RAAF during the Second World War.

He married Esme Hoinville at Gardenvale in September 1949.

He is depicted competing for a mark with Essendon player John Coleman in a bronze statue that was unveiled in 2006 outside the public library at Hastings, Victoria. He also appears in an iconic often-reproduced photograph with Jack Dyer of Richmond.

Notes

External links 		
		
		

		
		
1926 births
2018 deaths		
Australian rules footballers from Victoria (Australia)		
St Kilda Football Club players		
Fitzroy Football Club players
Brighton Football Club players
Royal Australian Air Force personnel of World War II
Royal Australian Air Force airmen
Military personnel from Victoria (Australia)
People from Hastings, Victoria
People from Port Fairy